The Seattle Mariners Hall of Fame is an American museum and hall of fame for the Seattle Mariners of Major League Baseball. It is located at T-Mobile Park in the SoDo district of downtown Seattle.

Museum overview
Seattle Mariners former chairman and CEO John Ellis announced on June 14, 1997, the creation of a Mariners Hall of Fame. It is operated by the Seattle Mariners organization. It honors the players, staff, and other individuals that greatly contributed to the history and success of the Mariners franchise. It is located at the Baseball Museum of the Pacific Northwest in T-Mobile Park. Inductees are selected on the criteria that they spent at least five seasons in a Mariners uniform and have been retired from baseball for two seasons. Inductees include Alvin Davis, Dave Niehaus, Jay Buhner, Edgar Martínez, Randy Johnson, Dan Wilson, Lou Piniella, Ken Griffey Jr., Jamie Moyer and Ichiro Suzuki.

Inductees

Alvin Davis

Davis, who batted left-handed and threw right-handed, played college baseball at Arizona State. Well liked by Mariners fans, Davis held most of the franchise's offensive team records until the advent of Ken Griffey Jr., Edgar Martínez, and Alex Rodriguez. Davis reached base in each of the first 47 games of his career, and was chosen for his only All-Star Game as a rookie. Named the Mariners MVP, he was also voted the American League's Rookie of the Year Award after batting .284 with 27 home runs and 116 RBI.

Davis, who was nicknamed Mr. Mariner, was inducted into the Seattle Mariners Hall of Fame in 1997.

Dave Niehaus

Niehaus was the team's lead announcer from its first game in 1977 until his death on November 10, 2010. Despite working for a franchise who from its first year in 1977 until 1991 was without a winning season, his talent was recognizable, and Niehaus was considered one of the few attractions for Mariner fans. Even in the period before the team's memorable 1995 season, the Mariners were regularly one of the leading major-league teams in terms of the percentage of radios in use.

Niehaus was and will continue to be immensely popular in Seattle; he was twice named Washington Sportscaster of the Year. The team chose him to throw out the ceremonial first pitch at the opening of its new ballpark, Safeco Field, on July 15, 1999. In 2000, he was the second figure to be inducted into the Mariners Hall of Fame. In , Niehaus was named the recipient of the Ford C. Frick Award, an award presented by the National Baseball Hall of Fame and Museum (often called "Cooperstown", from its location in Cooperstown, New York) which recognizes career excellence in baseball broadcasting and is considered the highest baseball broadcasting honor.

On November 10, 2010, Dave was the first member to pass away. He died of a heart attack at his home in Bellevue. He is survived by his wife, three children, six grandchildren, and countless friends.

Jay Buhner

Buhner was traded from the New York Yankees to the Seattle Mariners along with two career minor leaguers (Rich Balabon and Troy Evers) in exchange for Ken Phelps in 1988. This trade is often considered one of the worst made by the Yankees of that period, and the best in Mariner history. The trade was once noted humorously on the television program Seinfeld, in the episode "The Caddy", in which the Yankees' owner, George Steinbrenner, appears at the home of George Costanza's parents to inform them – mistakenly – that their son is dead. All Mr. Costanza can say is, "What the hell did you trade Jay Buhner for?! He had 30 home runs, over 100 RBIs last year! He's got a rocket for an arm ... You don't know what the hell you're doing!"

Buhner retired at the end of the  season as one of the most popular players in Mariners history. The Mariners have not issued his #19 jersey since he retired. According to Mariners team policy, he did not become eligible to have his number retired until . The Mariners require a player to have spent at least five years with the team and be elected to the Hall of Fame or narrowly miss election after spending his entire career with the team.

He holds the Seattle Mariners career record for strikeouts, with 1375, and has the lowest career stolen base percentage since  (6 stolen bases against 24 times caught stealing for a success rate of 20%; baseball did not keep track of times caught stealing until 1954). He was also known throughout baseball for his ability to vomit on command.

Edgar Martínez

Martínez's 18 seasons with the Mariners netted him 7 All-Star appearances, along with two batting titles and five Silver Slugger Awards. He finished first or second in on-base percentage (OBP) in 6 different years, and in the top 5 in the same category in 10 different years. Over the seven-year span of 1995–2001 he was considered one of the most consistent right-handed hitters in the game. During this time he hit .329 with a .445 on-base percentage and a .574 slugging percentage for an OPS (On-base Plus Slugging) of 1.019.  In 1996, he became only the fifth player in the 20th century to hit 50 doubles in two consecutive seasons. He is the Mariners' all-time leader in doubles (514), on-base percentage (.418), plate appearances (8,674), runs (1,219), extra base hits (838), RBI (1,261), total bases (3,718), walks (1,283), and games played (2,055). He is also among the top 10 in other categories including at-bats (7,213), hits (2,247), home runs (309), total bases.

Martínez is best remembered for his performance in the 1995 American League Division Series against the New York Yankees in which he hit .571 and was on base 18 times in 5 games. In game 4 of that series, he hit a three-run homer, then a grand slam home run that gave the Mariners a 10–6 lead en route to an 11–8 victory. His RBI total in that game set a single-game postseason record. The win knotted the best-of-five series at two games apiece and forced a decisive game 5. Down 5–4 in the 11th inning of that decisive game, Martínez hit a two-run double (called "The Double" by Mariners fans) off Jack McDowell, winning the game for the Mariners, 6–5.

Baseball lore says that Edgar Martínez "saved baseball in Seattle" with that double. While his series-winning hit did help build the groundswell that the Washington State Legislature eventually had to respond to (by enacting legislation to fund Safeco Field), it was one of many moments in a "miracle run" by the Mariners in September and October 1995 that changed public sentiment towards the team and towards public financing of a baseball-only stadium as a partial replacement for the Kingdome.

During his career, Martínez was a Mariner fan favorite, playing his entire career with the team, and always being willing to sign autographs for fans.  In October 2004, following his retirement, S. Atlantic Street in Seattle along Safeco Field's south facade was renamed Edgar Martínez Drive.

The Mariners did not issue Martínez' #11 jersey following his retirement as a player until his return to the team as hitting coach during the 2015 season, when he was issued #11 again. Under Mariners' team policy, his #11 was retired on August 12, 2017.

He was inducted into the Mariners Hall of Fame on June 2, 2007, and into the Baseball Hall of Fame July 21, 2019.

Dan Wilson

Wilson played 12 of his 14 Major League seasons for the Mariners (1994–2005), catching more games than any other player in Mariners history (1,281). He was a member of every Mariners team to have reached the playoffs. His combination of statistical achievement, leadership on the field and commitment to the Seattle community make him a worthy member of the Mariners Hall of Fame.

Wilson represented the Mariners on the 1996 American League All-Star team. He holds the Mariners record for most RBI by a catcher in a single season (83, 1996), and at the time of his retirement, he owned the team records for home runs by a catcher in his career (88, including two inside-the-park home runs) and in a single season (18, 1996). Wilson ended his career with a .995 fielding percentage, at the time the highest for any catcher in American League history, and the sixth highest in Major League history.

He was inducted with Randy Johnson into the Mariners Hall of Fame in July 2012.

Randy Johnson

Johnson played for the Mariners from 1989 to 1998. He was one of the most dominating pitchers in MLB history. He won five Cy Young Awards (1995, 1999–2002), including the first by a Mariners pitcher when he went 18–2 with a 2.48 ERA in 1995. Johnson pitched two no-hitters-June 2, 1990 vs. DET and MLB's 17th perfect game on May 18, 2004, while pitching for the Arizona Diamondbacks.

Johnson was instrumental in the team's first-ever trip to the postseason in 1995. During the regular season  the Mariners went an incredible 27–3 in games that Johnson started. In a one-game playoff on October 2 at the Kingdome, the Mariners beat the California Angels 9-1 behind Johnson's 12 strikeout, three-hit, complete game. In Game 5 of the ALDS vs. the Yankees, pitching on one day's rest, Johnson memorably strode in from the bullpen for a relief appearance. Johnson held off the Yankees for the comeback capped by Edgar Martínez's double that scored the winning run, allowing the team to make its first-ever appearance in the American League Championship Series.

Randy Johnson retired after the 2009 season with a career win–loss record of 303–166, ERA of 3.29 and 4,875 strikeouts, second only to Nolan Ryan's 5,714.  Under Mariners' team policy, he is eligible to have his #51 retired by the Mariners.

He was inducted with Dan Wilson into the Mariners Hall of Fame in July 2012. While his biography on Cooperstown's official website lists his primary team as the Mariners, his plaque at the museum shows him wearing an Arizona Diamondbacks cap.

Ken Griffey Jr.

Griffey began his career in Seattle in 1989 and played with the Mariners until 1999. He would later return in 2009 and retired during the 2010 season. Griffey Holds many Mariners records and will always be loved in Seattle sports lore. Safeco Field was referred to by Dave Niehaus as "The house that Griffey built." Under Mariners team policy, his #24 was retired at the start of the 2016 season, with a formal ceremony taking place on August 6, 2016. The Mariners also retired the number across their entire minor league organization. Griffey was inducted into the Mariners Hall of Fame on August 10, 2013.

Lou Piniella

Piniella managed the Mariners from 1993 to 2002. During his tenure, Piniella lead the team to all four of the franchise's playoff appearances. The two most memorable seasons, the thrilling comeback to win the first division title in 1995 and the record-setting 116-win season in 2001, won him AL manager of the year honors.

He was inducted into the Mariners Hall of Fame on August 9, 2014.

Jamie Moyer

Moyer played 11 seasons with Seattle, compiling a win-loss record of 145–87. He leads the franchise in wins and innings pitched (2,093), starts (323), and quality starts (188), and is third in strikeouts (1,239). Moyer was the Mariners Opening Day starting pitcher in 2000, 2004–2006. He also started the inaugural game at Safeco Field on July 15, 1999, with a called strike.

Moyer is the only Mariners pitcher to have won 20 games more than once, going 20–6 in 2001 and 21–7 in 2003. He was an All-Star in 2003 and was named Mariners Pitcher of the Year by the Baseball Writers' Association of America Seattle Chapter in 1998, 1999 and 2003.

Moyer has received numerous awards for his community service. In 2003, Jamie received the Roberto Clemente Award, Major League Baseball's top award for community service. He was also recognized for his "character and integrity" with the Hutch Award (2003), Lou Gehrig Award (2003) and Branch Rickey Award (2004). In 2000, Jamie and his wife Karen established The Moyer Foundation with the mission to provide comfort, hope, and healing to children affected by loss and family addiction. The foundation has raised millions of dollars to support hundreds of organizations providing direct services to children in need.

He was inducted into the Mariners Hall of Fame on August 8, 2015.

Ichiro Suzuki

As the first position player from Japan, Ichiro joined the Mariners on November 18, 2000. He played with them for 14 seasons (2001–2012, 2018–2019). He is second in total games played, and is first in total hits for the Mariners. With individual achievements including ten Golden Gloves, and holding the record for most hits in a season, Ichiro was considered a shoo-in for the Mariners hall of fame.

He was inducted into the Mariners Hall of Fame on August 27, 2022.

References

External links
Mariners Hall of Fame at Safeco Field
The Official Site of The Seattle Mariners | Mariners.com: Homepage
Baseball Museum of the Northwest

 
Major League Baseball museums and halls of fame
Halls of fame in Washington (state)
Sports museums in Washington (state)
Museums in Seattle
SoDo, Seattle